Carl Froch vs. Lucian Bute, billed as No Easy Way Out, a professional boxing match contested on 26 May 2012 for the IBF Super Middleweight title at the Capital FM Arena in Nottingham, United Kingdom.

The card was a co-production of Eddie Hearn's Matchroom Boxing and Jean Bedard's Interbox promotions and televised via Epix and Sky Sports. Showtime was not interested in this fight. Bute had one fight left on his Showtime deal. Rumours said that Showtime wanted to put on a fight between Lucian Bute and Bernard Hopkins or Andre Ward instead of Froch.

Background

Froch
Carl Froch was involved in Showtime's Super Six World Boxing Classic tournament. He ended up reaching the final, losing to Andre Ward. Then, IBF officially enforced Carl Froch as Lucian Bute's number one mandatory.

Bute
Lucian Bute's 3-fight Showtime deal was supposed to culminate in a showdown against the Super 6 winner, but Andre Ward was injured in the final. The American also criticised Bute's record, saying he would need to beat some top opponents to earn the right to face him

Bute agreed then to take a break from his contract with the Showtime channel and to accept what may end up being less than half his usual purse in order to travel to England to face Carl Froch, a two-time WBC champion with established credibility.

"In recent years, I've been criticized for only fighting at home but we never got offers to go elsewhere and I had to keep boxing," Bute said. "I decided that this time, I'll make my 10th defence in Nottingham."

The Fight

Despite being the overwhelming underdog with bookmakers, critics and fans around the world, Froch dominated the fight to win the IBF Super-Middleweight championship of the world by TKO in round 5 to become a three-time world champion.

Fight card
Super Middleweight Championship  Carl Froch vs.  Lucian Bute (c)
 Froch defeats Bute via KO in 5th round.
Super-Bantamweight Championship  Carl Frampton vs.  Raúl Hirales, Jr.
 Frampton defeats Hirales via unanimous decision.
Light Middleweight bout  Erick Ochieng vs.  A.A Lowe
 Ochieng defeats Lowe via unanimous decision.
Light Welterweight bout  Mark Loyd vs.  Pier-Olivier Côté 
 Côté defeats Loyd via KO in 5th round.
Middleweight bout  John Ryder vs.  Luke Robinson
 Ryder defeats Robinson via decision.
Middleweight bout  Ryan Aston vs.  Paul Samuels
 Aston defeats Samuels via 5th round.
Welterweight bout  Adnan Amar vs.  Terry Carruthers
 Carruthers defeats Amar via decision.
Lightweight bout  Scott Cardle vs.  Ideh Ockuko
 Cardle defeats Ockuko via decision.
Featherweight bout  Leigh Wood vs.  Delroy Spencer

Lightweight bout  Kieran Farrell vs.  Jason Nesbitt
 Farrell defeats Nesbitt via decision.

International broadcasting

References

External links
Carl Froch vs. Lucian Bute Official Fight Card from BoxRec

Boxing matches
2012 in boxing
Boxing in England
Sport in Nottingham
2012 in English sport
2010s in Nottingham
May 2012 sports events in Europe